In mathematics, the corona theorem is a result about the spectrum of the bounded holomorphic functions on the open unit disc,  conjectured by  and proved by  .

The commutative Banach algebra and Hardy space H∞ consists of the bounded holomorphic functions on the open unit disc D. Its spectrum S (the closed maximal ideals) contains D as an open subspace because for each z in D there is a  maximal ideal consisting of functions f with

f(z) = 0.

The subspace D cannot make up the entire spectrum S, essentially because the spectrum is a compact space and D is not. A more elementary formulation is that elements f1,...,fn generate the unit ideal of H∞ if and only if there is some δ>0 such that 
 everywhere in the unit ball.

Newman showed that the corona theorem can be reduced to an interpolation problem, which was then proved by Carleson.

Cole later showed that this result cannot be extended to all open Riemann surfaces .

As a by-product, of Carleson's work, the Carleson measure was invented which itself is a very useful tool in modern function theory.  It remains an open question whether there are versions of the corona theorem for every planar domain or for higher-dimensional domains.

Note that if one assumes the continuity up to the boundary in Corona's theorem, then the conclusion follows easily from the theory of commutative Banach algebra .

See also
Corona set

References 
 
 
  
 
  
 
 .
 .

Banach algebras
Hardy spaces
Theorems in complex analysis